Carex triangularis is a tussock-forming species of perennial sedge in the family Cyperaceae. It is native to central and south eastern parts of the United States.

See also
List of Carex species

References

triangularis
Taxa named by Johann Otto Boeckeler
Plants described in 1856
Flora of Arkansas
Flora of Illinois
Flora of Kansas
Flora of Kentucky
Flora of Louisiana
Flora of Mississippi
Flora of Missouri
Flora of Oklahoma
Flora of Tennessee
Flora of Texas